The Grinch is a video game based on the film How the Grinch Stole Christmas. The game was released around the time the film hit theaters in 2000. George Lowe does uncredited work as the narrator of the game. The Game Boy Color version was ported to Japan for release on November 22, 2000.

Gameplay
As the Grinch, the player can jump, ground pound, and use his smelly breath to guide his way through various obstacles in the game. As the game progresses different gadgets are unlocked which are used to complete different tasks.

Plot
The Grinch stares down at Whoville through his telescope from Mount Crumpit, planning to take the Whos' presents using his gadgets. He goes in his cave, and looks through his blueprints deciding which gadget to make first. However, the Grinch accidentally falls off his mountain of boxes and his blueprints fly away down to Whoville and various parts of Wholand. The Grinch visits Whoville, the Whoforest, Whoville Municipal Dump, and Wholake, destroying Christmas presents, playing pranks on the Whos and recovering pieces of his blueprints in the process so he can steal Christmas.

Reception

The Dreamcast, PC, and PlayStation versions received "mixed" reviews according to the review aggregation website Metacritic. John Gaudiosi of NextGen for the latter console version had positive comments on controls and graphics, but called the gameplay dull and not challenging and recommended the game only for Grinch fans.

The Game Boy Color version was a runner-up for the "Action Game of 2000" award in Editors' Choice at IGNs Best of 2000 Awards for Game Boy Color.

See also
Dr. Seuss: How the Grinch Stole Christmas!, another Grinch video game

Notes

References

External links
 
 
 

2000 video games
Dreamcast games
Game Boy Color games
PlayStation (console) games
Action-adventure games
How The Grinch Stole Christmas! video games
Video games based on adaptations
Universal Interactive games
Video games based on films
Behaviour Interactive games
Konami games
Video games developed in Canada
Windows games
3D platform games
Single-player video games